Rotenoids are naturally occurring substances containing a cis-fused tetrahydrochromeno[3,4-b]chromene nucleus. Many have insecticidal activity, such as the prototypical member of the family, rotenone.  Rotenoids are related to the isoflavones.

Natural occurrences 
Many plants in the subfamily Faboideae contain rotenoids. Rotenoids can be found in Lonchocarpus sp. Deguelin and tephrosin can be found in Tephrosia vogelii. 6'-O-β-D-glucopyranosyl-12a-hydroxydalpanol can be found in the fruits of Amorpha fruticosa. Elliptol, 12-deoxo-12alpha-methoxyelliptone, 6-methoxy-6a,12a-dehydrodeguelin, 6a,12a-dehydrodeguelin, 6-hydroxy-6a,12a-dehydrodeguelin, 6-oxo-6a,12a-dehydrodeguelin and 12a-hydroxyelliptone can be isolated from the twigs of Millettia duchesnei. Deguelin, dehydrodeguelin, rotenol, rotenone, tephrosin and sumatrol can be found in Indigofera tinctoria. 6aα,12aα-12a-hydroxyelliptone can be found in the stems of Derris trifoliata. Amorphol, a rotenoid bioside, can be isolated from plants of the genus Amorpha. Deguelin, rotenone, elliptone and α-toxicarol can be found in the seeds of Lonchocarpus salvadorensis. Clitoriacetal, stemonacetal, 6-deoxyclitoriacetal, 11-deoxyclitoriacetal, 9-demethylclitoriacetal and stemonal can be isolated from Clitoria fairchildiana.

Rotenoids can also be found in the plant family Nyctaginaceae. Mirabijalone A, B, C and D, 9-O-methyl-4-hydroxyboeravinone B, boeravinone C and F, and 1,2,3,4-tetrahydro-1-methylisoquinoline-7,8-diol) can be isolated from the roots of Mirabilis jalapa. Boeravinones G and H are two rotenoids isolated from Boerhavia diffusa. Abronione and boeravinone C can be found in the desert annual Abronia villosa.  In 2015, a new rotenoid called crocetenone was extracted from the rhizome of Iris crocea.

References 

 
Phenol ethers